Clark Township is one of seven townships in Perry County, Indiana, United States. As of the 2010 census, its population was 1,180 and it contained 544 housing units.

History
Clark Township was named for Robert Clark, a pioneer settler.

Geography

Unincorporated towns
 Adyeville at 
 Bristow at 
 Fosters Ridge at 
 Kitterman Corners at 
 Saint Josephs Shrine at 
 Sassafras at 
 Siberia at 
 Uniontown at 
(This list is based on USGS data and may include former settlements.)

Cemeteries
The township contains these fourteen cemeteries: Beard, Comstock, Crooks Thom, Enlow, Fox Ridge, Hobbs, Lanman, Lasher, Mount Pleasant, Sigler, Sigler, Stapleton, Taylor and Tenn Beard.

Major highways
  Interstate 64
  Indiana State Road 145

School districts
 Perry Central Community School Corporation

Political districts
 State House District 73
 State House District 74
 State Senate District 47

References
 
 United States Census Bureau 2009 TIGER/Line Shapefiles
 IndianaMap

External links
 Indiana Township Association
 United Township Association of Indiana
 City-Data.com page for Clark Township

Townships in Perry County, Indiana
Townships in Indiana